Ebrahimabad (also Romanized as Ebrāhīmābād; also known as Mehdīābād, Qal‘eh Āqā Ḩājī, Qal‘eh-i-Āgha Hāji, and Qal‘eh-ye Āqā Ḩājjī) is a village in Qaen Rural District, in the Central District of Qaen County, South Khorasan Province, Iran. At the 2006 census, its population was 539, in 118 families.

References 

Populated places in Qaen County